LaSalle Street is a major north-south street in Chicago named for Robert de La Salle, a 17th century French explorer of the Illinois Country.  The portion that runs through the Chicago Loop is considered to be Chicago's financial district.

South Side
South of the Financial District, LaSalle Street gets cut off for a while by the Amtrak/Metra Rail yard from Taylor St to 1600 South. It runs parallel to the Rock Island District Metra line. South of 26th Street, it serves as a frontage road for the Dan Ryan Expressway until 47th street, where it merges with Wentworth Avenue. South of 47th, it starts and stops as a local street until it finally terminates at Sibley Boulevard in Dolton.

In the Loop
The stretch of LaSalle Street and its adjacent buildings in the Loop is recognized as the West Loop–LaSalle Street Historic District. The south end of LaSalle Street terminates at the art-deco Chicago Board of Trade Building, a Chicago Landmark and National Historic Landmark.  The LaSalle Street Station commuter terminal is located directly south of the Board of Trade.  An art deco skyscraper at 135 S. LaSalle and a modern skyscraper 190 S. LaSalle line the street.  One North LaSalle, the former Field Building, Chicago City Hall and the James R. Thompson Center are located within the Loop on LaSalle Street.

The street was nicknamed "The Canyon" due to the tall, steep buildings that lie on both ends of the relatively narrow street, with the Chicago Board of Trade Building as the abrupt end of the apparent box canyon.

The Rookery Building is a historic landmark located at 219 South LaSalle Street.  Completed by John Wellborn Root and Daniel Burnham of Burnham and Root in 1888, it is considered one of their masterpiece buildings. It measures , is twelve stories tall and is one of the oldest standing high-rises in Chicago.  It has a unique style with exterior load-bearing walls and an interior steel frame.

Originally open to only pedestrians and private vehicles, the LaSalle tunnel was turned over to cable car companies in the 1880s, since it was impossible for cable car systems to span the movable bridges. Closed in 1906, the tunnel was deepened and reopened to electric street car traffic in 1911-12. The tunnel was closed permanently in 1939 to make way for subway construction.

North of the river
Moving north from the Loop, the street crosses the Chicago River using the La Salle Street Bridge. In the Near North Side, 300 North LaSalle is located on the north banks of the Chicago River, one block east of the Merchandise Mart. On the corner at Chicago Avenue, LaSalle is adjacent to the entrance of Moody Bible Institute. The street ends 10-blocks north, in Lincoln Park, just past its intersection with North Avenue, where Moody Church stands on the east side of LaSalle. North of the river until the terminus at DuSable Lake Shore Drive, City of Chicago signage refers to LaSalle Street as “LaSalle Drive.”

In popular culture
The street, Chicago Board of Trade Building, and 200 North LaSalle were used in the 2005 film Batman Begins its sequel The Dark Knight, and the 2021 film The Batman, as well as in the 1999 movie Payback. The view facing south down the canyon has been used in the movies The Untouchables, Public Enemies, Transformers 3: Dark of the Moon and Road to Perdition. The canyon was in the movie Ferris Bueller's Day Off.

References

External links

Streets in Chicago
Financial districts in the United States